Laquintasaura is a genus of Venezuelan ornithischian dinosaur containing only the type species Laquintasaura venezuelae.  The species was the first dinosaur to have been identified from Venezuela. It is known from extensive remains, all from a singular bonebed locality which has been sampled for specimen blocks over the course of several expeditions, largely led by Marcelo R Sánchez-Villagra. A small, very primitive animal, it is known for its distinct dental anatomy and for being one of the earliest and most primitive ornithischians in the fossil record. Taxonomic uncertainty has led to conflicting theories that it is either as the base of Ornithischia or at the base of the subgroup Thyreophora. In either model, its dating to around 200 million years ago, at the start of the Jurassic, existence in equatorial latitudes, and primitive nature make it a key view into early ornithischian evolution. It's thought that Laquintasaura would've lived in groups and had a possible omnivorous diet, living on a seasonal alluvial plain and being preyed about by the contemporary Tachiraptor.

Discovery and naming
 
The bonebed would produce material eventually named as Laquintasaura was originally discovered in the 1980s, by a team of French palaeontologists. The bonebed is found near a road between the towns of La Grita and Seboruco, in the Táchira state of Venezuela, in rocks pertaining to the Early Jurassic La Quinta Formation; it is directly opposite to the type section of the formation, separated by possible geologic faults. These initial French discoveries - two teeth and a quadrate would be brought to Paris and described by D.E. Russel and colleagues in a 1992 study; based on similar cranial anatomy, they were referred to the genus Lesothosaurus, an early ornithischian from the Early Jurassic of Lesotho and South Africa. Unaware of the French team's discoveries, Marcelo R. Sánchez-Villagra and colleagues would make their own expeditions into the La Quinta Formation; initially finding no vertebrate fossils in 1989, they'd later rediscover the bonebed in the first of three expeditions in 1992 and 1993; dinosaur expert James Clark was the one to first notice the easy to miss locality. A few plaster jackets worth of fossils were recovered and transported by Sánchez-Villagra to Buenos Aires in Argentina, where he and the team of Dr. Guillermo Rougier spent three months partially preparing the fossils. After this they were returned to Venezuela, being brought to Universidad Simón Bolívar where Sánchez-Villagra had written his thesis. Several years later in the late 1990s, Sánchez-Villagra would become aware of the French specimens and co-ordinate their return to Venezuela as well, deposited in the collections of the Museu de Biología de la Universidad de Zulia (MBLUZ).

Sánchez-Villagra become aware he was no longer permitted to study the fossils that had been deposited at the Universidad Simón Bolívar soon after they have been transferred, and resolved to conduct new expeditions to gather additional material from the bonebed; the Universidad Simón Bolívar material has gone unstudied since. Shortly before hearing this news an attempted expedition had failed due to a truck failure. A successful trip was organized in December of 1993, with a new team from Caracas, which produced abundant new material. This was deposited in the MBLUZ, like the original French material. Early preparation of these blocks was reported on at the 1994 conference of the Society of Vertebrate Paleontology. Sánchez-Villagra and Fernando Novas, who had met during the preparation in Buenos Aires, obtained a grant from the Jurassic Foundation to study the 1993 material. The project would eventually become based in the Natural History Museum in London, England and would bring in Paul Barrett. He, Novas, Sánchez-Villagra, and colleagues would finally publish on the material in a 2008 paper in the scientific journal PalZ, identifying a likely new genus of ornithischian among many other indeterminate animals but not naming it until further material was known.

That further material would become recognized and published on in a 2014 paper in the journal Proceedings of the Royal Society B by a team including Barrett and Sánchez-Villagra. This paper would re-evaluate the 2008 paper's conclusions, finding through comparisons with newly prepared material as well as new data on the usefulness of identifying features relied on by the 2008 study that almost all material in the bonebed (excepting two theropod teeth, later described with a newly recognized tibia as Tachiraptor) in fact belonged to the previously identified ornithischian taxon. With the entire wealth of material now recognized as belonging to the taxon, they formally named it as Laquintasaura venezuelae. The generic name derives from the name of the geologic formation and the feminine Greek suffix for lizard; the specific name refers to the country and people of Venezuela. Forelimb material was completely absent, and material from the hindfeet was very limited. Much of the material was still unprepared at this time, and it's possible much more material remains ungathered from the bonebed. A later 2021 study by Carlos-Manuel Herrera-Castillo, Sánchez-Villagra, and colleagues described a premaxilla prepared and studied since the 2014 paper; at the time of this publication, study and preparation of much material remains ongoing. As it is the oldest reliably dated ornithischian, hailing from the very start of the Jurassic, its discovery is considered to very significant.

Hundreds of individual fossil elements are known for Laquintasaura, representing a minimum of four individuals and potentially many more. The majority of known remains are thought to represent subadult individuals, but one small  is thought to belong to a juvenile (organism) and a scapular fragment is thought to be long to an adult. Among the material, the isolated tooth MBLUZ P.1396 was designated as the holotype, forming the type series with paratypes MBLUZ P.5017, a partial femur; MBLUZ P.5018, partial left ; and MBLUZ P.5005, a left astragalocalcaneum. Though the choice of a tooth as the type specimen is uncommon for a dinosaur, it was chosen due to being the most distinctive aspect of the anatomy, being a very abundant element of the sample, and the unlikelihood that teeth would different in different parts of the mouth due to the uniformity of the known teeth and anatomy of relatives.

Description

Like other early members of Ornithischia, it is assumed that Laquintasaura was a lithe bipedal animal. The individual in question was, however, a subadult, indicating that the species may have gotten slightly larger as an adult, as indicated by other more fragmentary elements less useful for size estimation. Its small size and conservative skeletal anatomy indicates it, and other ornithischians at the very beginning of the Jurassic, had not yet diversified extensively from their ancestral anatomical state. Only later would the group diverge into larger, more specialized animals with traits with armor and quadrupeality. 

The most distinctive part of the anatomy is Laquintasaura is found in its dentition, with numerous autapomorphies found therein. Coarse denticles run along the entire crown margin (the edge of the exposed tooth). The teeth are laterally widest near this apex, and they possess uniquely prominent striations on both the inside and outside sides of the tooth. The premaxilla of L. venezuelae has seven teeth in each position and does not present a diastema close to the premaxillo-maxillary suture. Such a high number of premaxillary teeth is uncommon in ornithischians outside of some members of Ankylosauria; later members of Ornithischia would reduce their premaxillary tooth count until many didn't possess any whatsoever. The high count in Laquintasaura elucidates the basal state of having many teeth, and indicates its dental anatomy is very primitive even compared to other Early Jurassic taxa.

The  anatomy of Laquintasaura is less remarkable than that of its dentition, but still possesses a few autapormophies. Finally, the  has a broad and deep U-shaped notch on its top surface; a similar V-shaped notch is seen in Scutellosaurus, but is noticeably less developed in that genus, being less than half as deep. In contrast to these unique traits, ornithischian synapomorphies can be seen in the pelvic anatomy. In addition to its diagnostic features, numerous differences from other individual basal ornithischian taxa were noted, described in detail in the supplementary material of the 2014 description paper.

The histology of the bone microstructure of specimens referred to Laquintasaura indicate it had secondarily reduced growth rates compared to the presumed ancestral state of ornithischians, similar to other small thyreophorans like Scutellosaurus but unlike Lesothosaurus, ornithopods, and marginocephalians. However, the lack of data on primitive ornithischian histology as well as the limited sample size available for Laquintasaura, these conclusions remain uncertain.

Classification 

The specifics of the phylogenetic relationships of Laquintasaura remains somewhat uncertain. Phylogenetic analyses as well general anatomy demonstrate robustly that it's a very basal member of the group Ornithischia. Its exact position within this clade was unresolved by the original 2014 description, which found it in a large polytomy with Eocursor, Lesothosaurus, Stormbergia, Scutellosaurus, the clade Thyreophora, and the clade Neornithischia. Some later phylogenetic analyses have had to remove the taxon outright due to being too fragmentary and lowering the resolution of the results. Some studies, such as that of Matthew G. Baron and colleagues or that of Thomas J. Raven and Susannah Maidment, both in 2017, have found it to be a very early member of the group Thyreophora, as the sister taxon of Scutellosaurus. Bone histology, similar to Scutellosaurus but unlike Lesothosaurus, has been posited as circumstantial evidence of this placement. On the other hand, the analysis of a study on ornithischian phylogeny by P. E. Dieudonné and colleagues in 2021 found Laquintasaura not as a thyreophoran but in a more primitive position outside of the clade Genasauria. The cladogram from Baron et al. (2017) is shown below on the left, and that of Dieudonné et al. (2021) is shown on the below right. Clade names have been inserted based on definitions established by a paper by Daniel Madzia and colleagues in 2021 for clarity.

Palaeoecology

Laquintasaura hails from the La Quinta Formation of northern South America, in what is now Colombia and Venezuela, and was found in the Venezuelan part of the formation. The exact age of the La Quinta Formation was traditionally very unclear, with estimates variably placing anywhere from the Permian to the Cretaceous, but modern estimates tend to find that the section containing the Laquintasaura bonebed dates to very near the boundary of the Triassic and Jurassic periods, specifically at start of the Hettangian age around 200 million years ago and potentially as little at 150 thousand years from the end of the Triassic, though some uncertainty still exists. This very old age makes Laquintasaura one of the earliest known members of Ornithischia, making it important to understanding their early evolution. It provides concrete evidence that they had spread to the northern hemisphere by the start of the Jurassic, and its geographic placement in an equatorial region demonstrates dinosaur presence in equatorial latitudes, as well as such region's role in early dinosaur evolution, something traditionally doubted. Though the genus' presence so soon after the end-Triassic extinction indicates ornithischians achieved quick expansion in diversity and distribution, its conservative anatomy indicates that increases in body size and anatomical specialization did not occur until later in the Jurassic.

The ecosystem that Laquintasaura lived in is thought to represent an alluvial plain, with both arid and humid seasons. The early theropod dinosaur Tachiraptor would have lived alongside Laquintasaura, and likely preyed upon it. The sauropod dinosaur Perijasaurus also hails from the La Quinta Formation, but is thought to have lived at a later time near the end of the Early Jurassic, around 175 million years ago. Laquintasaura is thought to have been primarily herbivorous, but the unusually tall structure of the teeth are reminiscent of carnivorous animals, indicating they may have also eaten things like small insects as part of their diet. Similar omnivorous behaviour has been suggested in the fellow primitive ornithischian Lesothosaurus, as well as more tentatively in taxa like Agilisaurus, Hypsilophodon, and Orodromeus before disappearing in more derived relatives like iguanodontians.

The exact nature of the taphonomy of the Laquintasaura bonebed remains incompletely studied. The remains are thought to have undergone some degree of low-energy transport, but the lack of any damage to the bones, or signs of things like plant root damage or insect boring holes, indicating the remains were not exposed for a long time prior to being buried. The bonebed is entirely devoid of microfossils, invertebrates, or plant remains, and is palynologically barren; the only other animal found at the site is the scant remains of Tachiraptor. All of this indicates the four or more individuals at the site likely died together and maybe have lived together in life, indicative of social behaviour. Herding is known in ornithischians of the Late Jurassic and Cretaceous, but its presence in Laquintasaura would be the first recognized in such an early member of the group (though more recent research has also indicated presence in the genus Lesothosaurus).

References

Ornithischian genera
Early Jurassic dinosaurs of South America
Fossils of Venezuela
Jurassic Venezuela
Fossil taxa described in 2014